The Miami Marlins' 2016 season was the 24th season for the Major League Baseball franchise, and the fifth as the "Miami" Marlins. This was the first season under manager Don Mattingly. The Marlins finished in third place in the National League East and they failed to make the playoffs for the 13th consecutive season.

Season standings

National League East

National League Wild Card

Record vs. opponents

Detailed records

Game log

|- style="background:#fbb;"
| 1 || April 5 || Tigers || 7–8 (11) || VerHagen (1–0) || Breslow (0–1) || Greene (1) || 36,911 || 0–1||L1
|- style="background:#fbb;"
| 2 || April 6 || Tigers || 3–7 || Sánchez (1–0) || Fernández (0–1) || Rodriguez (1) || 17,883 || 0–2||L2
|- style="background:#bfb;"
| 3 || April 7 || @ Nationals || 6–4 || Phelps (1–0) || Roark (0–1) || Ramos (1) || 41,650 || 1–2||W1
|- align="center" bgcolor="bbbbbb"
| – || April 9 || @ Nationals || colspan=7| Postponed (inclement weather) Rescheduled for May 14 as part of a doubleheader
|- style="background:#fbb;"
| 4 || April 10 || @ Nationals || 2–4 || Ross (1–0) || Koehler (0–1) || Papelbon (3) || 24,593 || 1–3||L1
|- style="background:#bfb;"
| 5 || April 11 || @ Mets || 10–3 || Narveson (1–0) || Matz (0–1) || — || 24,318 || 2–3||W1
|- style="background:#bfb;"
| 6 || April 12 || @ Mets || 2–1 || Phelps (2–0) || Henderson (0–1) || Ramos (2) || 28,923 || 3–3||W2
|- style="background:#fbb;"
| 7 || April 13 || @ Mets || 1–2 || Blevins (0–1) || McGowan (0–1) || Familia (2) || 22,113 || 3–4||L1
|- style="background:#fbb;"
| 8 || April 15 || Braves || 3–6 || Ogando (1–0) || Phelps (2–1) || Vizcaino (1) || 18,071 || 3–5||L2
|- style="background:#fbb;"
| 9 || April 16 || Braves || 4–6 || Norris (1–2) || Koehler (0–2) || Grilli (1) || 33,123 || 3–6||L3
|- style="background:#fbb;"
| 10 || April 17 || Braves || 5–6 (10) || Grilli (1–0) || Jackson (0–1) || Wisler (1) || 24,780  || 3–7||L4
|- style="background:#bfb;"
| 11 || April 18 || Nationals || 6–1 || Fernández (1–1) || Roark (1–2) || — || 16,112 || 4–7||W1
|- style="background:#fbb;"
| 12 || April 19 || Nationals || 0–7 || Strasburg (3–0) || Conley (0–1) || — || 16,529 || 4–8 ||L1
|- style="background:#fbb;"
| 13 || April 20 || Nationals || 1–3 || Petit (1–0) || Chen (0–1) || Papelbon (6) || 16,961 || 4–9 ||L2
|- style="background:#bfb;"
| 14 || April 21 || Nationals || 5–1 || Koehler (1–2) || Scherzer (2–1) || — || 17,395 || 5–9 ||W1
|- style="background:#fbb;"
| 15 || April 22 || @ Giants || 1–8 ||Samardzija (2–1)  || Cosart (0–1)  || — || 41,760 || 5–10||L1
|- style="background:#fbb;"
| 16 || April 23 || @ Giants || 2–7 ||Peavy (1–1)  || Fernández (1–2) || — || 41,886 || 5–11||L2
|- style="background:#bfb;"
| 17 || April 24 || @ Giants || 5–4 ||Barraclough (1–0)  || Osich (0–1)  || Ramos (3) || 41,509 || 6–11||W1
|- style="background:#bfb;
| 18 || April 25 || @ Dodgers || 3–2 ||Chen (1–1)  || Stripling (0–1) || Ramos (4) || 44,954 || 7–11||W2
|- style="background:#bfb;
| 19 || April 26 || @ Dodgers || 6–3 ||Koehler (2–2)  || Kershaw (2–1)  || Ramos (5) || 41,102 || 8–11||W3
|- style="background:#bfb;
| 20 || April 27 || @ Dodgers || 2–0 ||Nicolino (1–0)  || Kazmir (1–2) || Ureña (1) || 38,909 || 9–11||W4
|- style="background:#bfb;
| 21 || April 28 || @ Dodgers || 5–3 ||Fernández (2–2)  ||Maeda (3–1)  ||Ramos (6) || 44,009 || 10–11||W5
|- style="background:#bfb;
| 22 || April 29 || @ Brewers || 6–3 ||Conley (1–1)  ||Davies (0–3)  || Ramos (7) || 23,215 || 11–11||W6
|- style="background:#bfb;
| 23 || April 30 || @ Brewers ||7–5 ||Chen (2–1)  ||Anderson (1–3)  || Phelps (1) || 28,193 || 12–11||W7
|-

|- style="background:#fbb;"
| 24 || May 1 || @ Brewers || 5–14 || Peralta (2–3) ||Koehler (2–3)  || — || 28,181 || 12–12||L1
|- style="background:#bfb;
| 25 || May 3 || D-backs || 7–4 ||Nicolino (2–0)  || Chafin (0–1)  || Ramos (8) || 16,323 || 13–12||W1
|- style="background:#bfb;
| 26 || May 4 || D-backs || 4–3 || Fernández (3–2) || De La Rosa (3–4) || Ramos (9) || 17,043 || 14–12||W2
|- style="background:#bfb;
| 27 || May 5 || D-backs || 4–0 || Conley (2–1) || Ray (1–2) || — || 16,704 || 15–12||W3
|- style="background:#bfb;
| 28 || May 6 || Phillies || 6–4 || Barraclough (2–0) || Neris (0–1) || Phelps (2) || 19,983 || 16–12 ||W4
|- style="background:#fbb;"
| 29 || May 7 || Phillies || 3–4 || Obetholtzer (2–0) || Breslow (0–2) || Gómez (10) || 21,719 || 16–13||L1
|- style="background:#fbb;"
| 30 || May 8 || Phillies || 5–6 || Neris (1–1) || Phelps (2–2) || Gómez (11) || 19,625 || 16–14||L2
|- style="background:#bfb;
| 31 || May 9 || Brewers || 4–1 || Fernández (4–2) || Peralta (2–4) || Morris (1) || 16,769 || 17–14||W1
|- style="background:#fbb;"
| 32 || May 10 || Brewers || 2–10 || Davies (1–3) || Conley (2–2) || — || 17,225 || 17–15||L1
|- style="background:#bfb;
| 33 || May 11 || Brewers || 3–2 || Chen (3–1) || Anderson (1–5) || Ramos (10) || 19,893 || 18–15||W1
|- style="background:#fbb;"
| 34 || May 13 || @ Nationals || 3–5 || Treinen W (3–1) || Barraclough L (2–1) || Papelbon (10) || 28,232 || 18–16||L1
|- style="background:#fbb;"
| 35 || May 14 (1) || @ Nationals || 4–6 || Strasburg (6–0) || Nicolino (2–1) || Papelbon (11) || 28,634 || 18–17||L2
|- style="background:#bfb;
| 36 || May 14 (2) || @ Nationals || 7–1 || Ureña (1–0) || Roark (2–3) || — || 30,019 || 19–17||W1
|- style="background:#bfb;
| 37 || May 15 || @ Nationals || 5–1 || Fernández (5–2) || Ross (3–3) || Ramos (11) || 36,786 || 20–17||W2
|- style="background:#bfb;
| 38 || May 16 || @ Phillies || 5–3 || Conley (3–2) || Eickhoff (1–6) || Ramos (12) || 28,348 || 21–17||W3
|-style="background:#fbb;"
| 39 || May 17 || @ Phillies || 1–3 || Velasquez (5–1) || Chen (3–2) || Gómez (15) || 18,140 || 21–18 ||L1
|-style="background:#fbb;"
| 40 || May 18 || @ Phillies || 2–4 || Hellickson (4–2) || Koehler (2–4) || Gómez (16) || 29,579 || 21–19 || L2
|-style="background:#fbb;"
| 41 || May 20 || Nationals || 1–4 || Roark (3–3) || Nicolino (2–2) || Papelbon (12) || 20,017 || 21–20 || L3
|- style="background:#bfb;
| 42 || May 21 || Nationals || 3–2 || Fernández (6–2) || Ross (3–4) || Ramos (13) || 25,839 || 22–20 || W1
|-style="background:#fbb;"
| 43 || May 22 || Nationals || 2–8 || Scherzer (5–3) || Conley (3–3) || — || 24,308 || 22–21 || L1
|-style="background:#bfb;
| 44 || May 23 || Rays || 7–6 || Phelps (3–2) || Ramirez (6–2) || Ramos (14) || 17,969 || 23–21 ||W1
|-style="background:#fbb;"
| 45 || May 24 || Rays || 3–4 || Odorizzi (2–2) || Koehler (2–5) || Colomé (12) || 23,709 || 23–22||L1
|-style="background:#bfb;
| 46 || May 25 || @ Rays || 4–3 || Barraclough (3–1) || Sturdevant (0–1) || Ramos (15) || 13,554 || 24–22||W1
|-style="background:#bfb;
| 47 || May 26 || @ Rays || 9–1 || Fernández (7–2) || Smyly (2–6) || — || 11,399 || 25–22 ||W2
|-style="background:#fbb;"
| 48 || May 27 || @ Braves || 2–4 || Krol (1–0) || Phelps (3–3) || Vizcaino (6) || 19,325 || 25–23 ||L1
|-style="background:#fbb;"
| 49 || May 28 || @ Braves || 2–7 || O'Flaherty (1–3) || Ureña (1–1) || — || 33,879 || 25–24 ||L2
|-style="background:#bfb;
| 50 || May 29 || @ Braves || 7–3 || Koehler (3–5) || Teheran (1–5) || — || 50,247 || 26–24 ||W1
|-style="background:#fbb;"
| 51 || May 30 || Pirates || 0–10 || Locke (4–3) || Nicolino (2–3) || — || 10,856 || 26–25 || L1
|-style="background:#bfb;
| 52 || May 31 || Pirates || 3–1 || Fernández (8–2) || Cole (5–4) || Ramos (16) || 10,637 || 27–25 || W1
|-

|-style="background:#bfb;
| 53 || June 1 || Pirates || 3–2 || Phelps (4–3) || Watson (1–1) || Ramos (17) || 17,018 || 28–25 ||W2
|-style="background:#bfb;
| 54 || June 2 || Pirates || 4–3 (12) || Wittgren (1–0) || Schugel (1–2) || — || 19,907 || 29–25 ||W3
|-style="background:#fbb;"
| 55 || June 3 || Mets || 2–6 || Syndergaard (6–2) || Koehler (3–6) || — || 22,269 || 29–26 ||L1
|-style="background:#fbb;"
| 56 || June 4 || Mets || 4–6 || Henderson (1–2) || Phelps (4–4) || Familia (18) || 24,668 || 29–27 ||L2
|-style="background:#bfb;
| 57 || June 5 || Mets || 1–0 || Fernández (9–2) || Harvey (4–8)  || Ramos (18) || 28,196 || 30–27 ||W1
|-style="background:#fbb;"
| 58 || June 7 || @ Twins || 4–6 (11) || Boshers (1–0) || McGowan (0–2) || — || 19,020 || 30–28 || L2
|-style="background:#fbb;"
| 59 || June 8 || @ Twins || 5–7 || Rogers (2–0) || Wittgren (1–1) || Kintzler (1) || 21,527 || 30–29 || L3
|-style="background:#bfb;
| 60 || June 9 || @ Twins || 10–3 || Koehler (4–6) || Santana (1–6)  || — || 18,792 || 31–29 || W1
|-style="background:#bfb;
| 61 || June 10 || @ D-backs || 8–6 ||Ellington (1–0)  || Clippard (2–3)  || Ramos (19) || 26,970 || 32–29 || W2
|-style="background:#fbb;"
| 62 || June 11 || @ D-backs || 3–5 || Godley (1–0) || Fernández (9–3) || Ziegler (12) || 33,442 || 32–30 || L1
|-style="background:#fbb;"
| 63 || June 12 || @ D-backs || 0–6 || Ray (3–5) || Conley (3–4) || — || 27,741 || 32–31 || L2
|-style="background:#bfb;
| 64 || June 13 || @ Padres || 13–4 || Chen (4–2) || Rea (3–3) || — || 20,988 || 33–31 || W1
|-style="background:#bfb;
| 65 || June 14 || @ Padres || 5–2 || Koehler (5–6) || Pomeranz (5–7) || Ramos (20) || 22,051 || 34–31|| W2
|-style="background:#fbb;"
| 66 || June 15 || @ Padres || 3–6 || Perdomo (2–2) || Nicolino (2–4) || Rodney (13) || 20,037 ||34–32|| L1
|-style="background:#bfb;
| 67 || June 17 || Rockies || 5–1 || Wittgren (2–1) || Gray (4–3)  || — || 19,767  || 35–32 ||W1
|-style="background:#bfb;
| 68 || June 18 || Rockies || 9–6 || McGowan (1–2)  || Butler (2–4)  || Ramos (21) || 19,565 || 36–32 ||W2
|-style="background:#bfb;
| 69 || June 19 || Rockies || 3–0 || Koehler (6–6)  || Anderson (0–1)  || Ramos (22)|| 24,993 || 37–32 ||W3
|-style="background:#fbb;"
| 70 || June 20 || Rockies || 3–5 || De La Rosa (4–4) || Ellington (1–1) || Estévez (4) || 18,187 || 37–33||L1
|-style="background:#fbb;"
| 71 || June 21 || Braves || 2–3 || Withrow (2–0) || Barraclough (3–2) || Vizcaíno (8) || 19,961 || 37–34||L2
|-style="background:#bfb;"
| 72 || June 22 || Braves || 3–0 || Conley (4–4) || Gant (1–2) || Ramos (23) || 22,642 || 38–34 || W1
|-style="background:#bfb;"
| 73 || June 23 || Cubs || 4–2 || Barraclough (4–2) || Strop (1–2) || Phelps (3) || 25,291 || 39–34 || W2
|-style="background:#fbb;
| 74 || June 24 || Cubs || 4–5 || Cahill (1–2) || Dunn (0–1) || Rondon (13) || 24,385 || 39–35|| L1
|-style="background:#bfb;"
| 75 || June 25 || Cubs || 9–6 || Clemens (1–0) || Lackey (7–4) || Ramos (24) || 29,457 || 40–35 || W1
|-style="background:#bfb;"
| 76 || June 26 || Cubs || 6–1 || Fernández (10–3) || Hammel (7–4) || — || 27,318 || 41–35|| W2
|-style="background:#fbb;
| 77 || June 28 || @ Tigers || 5–7 || Pelfrey (2–7) || Conley (4–5) || Rodriguez (21) || 30,808 || 41–36 ||L1 
|-style="background:#fbb;
| 78 || June 29 || @ Tigers || 3–10 || Norris (1–0) || Koehler (6–7) || — || 31,760 || 41–37||L2
|-style="background:#fbb;
| 79 || June 30 || @ Braves || 5–8 || Alvarez (2–1) || Chen (4–3) || Cabrera (1) || 16,097 || 41–38 ||L3
|-

|-style="background:#bfb;"
| 80 || July 1 || @ Braves || 7–5 (12)|| Wittgren (3–1) || Kelly (0–3) || McGowan (1) || 32,036 || 42–38||W1
|-style="background:#fbb;
| 81 || July 2 || @ Braves || 1–9 || Harrell (1–0) || Fernández (10–4) || — || 23,448 || 42–39||L1
|-style="background:#bfb;"
| 82 || July 3 (Fort Bragg Game)
|| @ Braves(Fort Bragg Stadium) || 5–2 || Conley (5–5) || Wisler (3–8) || — || 12,582 || 43–39||W1
|-style="background:#fbb;
| 83 || July 4 || @ Mets || 6–8 || Blevins (3–0) || Rodney (0–2) || Familia (29) || 30,424 || 43–40||L1
|-style="background:#bfb;
| 84 || July 5 || @ Mets || 5–2 ||Chen (5–3)||Matz (7–4)||Ramos (25)||29,477|| 44–40||W1
|-style="background:#fbb;
| 85 || July 6 || @ Mets || 2–4 ||deGrom (5–4)||Nicolino (2–5)||Familia (30)||26,191|| 44–41||L1
|-style="background:#bfb;
| 86 || July 8 || Reds || 3–1 ||Fernández (11–4) ||Straily (4–6)  ||Ramos (26) ||22,333|| 45–41 ||W1
|-style="background:#bfb;
| 87 || July 9 || Reds || 4–2 ||Conley (6–5) ||Lamb (1–6)  || Ramos (27) || 23,653 || 46–41 ||W2
|-style="background:#bfb;
| 88 || July 10 || Reds || 7–3 ||Dunn (1–1) ||Reed (0–4)  || — || 22,394 || 47–41 ||W3
|- style="text-align:center; background:#bbcaff;"
| colspan="10" | 87th All-Star Game in San Diego, California
|- style="background:#bfb;
| 89 || July 15 || @ Cardinals || 7–6 || Rodney (1–2) ||Oh (2–1)  ||Ramos (28) || 42,034 || 48–41 ||W4
|- style="background:#fbb;
| 90 || July 16 || @ Cardinals || 0–5 || Wainwright (9–5)  ||Koehler (6–8)  || — || 44,840 || 48–42 ||L1
|-style="background:#bfb;
| 91 || July 17 || @ Cardinals || 6–3 || Barraclough (5–2)  ||Broxton (1–2) || Ramos (29) || 43,046 || 49–42 || W1
|-style="background:#bfb;
| 92 || July 18 || @ Phillies || 3–2 (11) ||Barraclough (6–2)   ||Oberholtzer (2–2)  || Ramos (30) || 19,115 || 50–42 || W2
|-style="background:#bfb;
| 93 || July 19 || @ Phillies || 2–1 (10) ||Dunn (2–1) || Hernandez (1–3)  || Ramos (31)  || 18,347 || 51–42 || W3
|- style="background:#fbb;
| 94 || July 20 || @ Phillies || 1–4 || Hellickson (7–7) || Chen (5–4) || Gómez (26) || 20,654 || 51–43 || L1
|-style="background:#bfb;
| 95 || July 21 || @ Phillies || 9–3 || Koehler (7–8)  || Eickhoff (6–11)  || — || 27,839 || 52–43 || W1
|-style="background:#fbb;
| 96 || July 22 || Mets || 3–5 || Robles (5–3) || Phelps (4–5) || Familia (34) || 23,661 || 52–44||L1
|-style="background:#bfb;
| 97 || July 23 || Mets || 7–2 || Fernández (12–4) || deGrom (6–5) || — || 26,481 || 53–44||W1
|-style="background:#fbb;
| 98 || July 24 || Mets || 0–3 || Matz (8–6) || Urena (1–2) || Familia (35) || 25,004 || 53–45||L1
|-style="background:#fbb;
| 99 || July 25 || Phillies || 0–4 || Hernandez (2–3) || Rodney (1–3) || — || 19,465 || 53–46||L2
|-style="background:#bfb;
| 100 || July 26 || Phillies || 5–0 || Koehler (8–8) || Eickhoff (6–12) || — || 20,365 || 54–46||W1
|-style="background:#bfb;
| 101 || July 27 || Phillies || 11–1 || Conley (7–5) || Eflin (3–4) || — || 32,403 || 55–46||W2
|-style="background:#fbb;
| 102 || July 28 || Cardinals || 4–5 || Wacha (6–7) || Fernández (12–5) || Oh (7) || 25,060 || 55–47||L1
|-style="background:#fbb;
| 103 || July 29 || Cardinals || 6–11 || Leake (8–8) || Urena (1–3) || — || 27,414 || 55–48||L2
|-style="background:#bfb;
| 104 || July 30 || Cardinals || 11–0 || Phelps (5–5) || Garcia (7–8) || — ||  || 56–48||W1
|-style="background:#bfb;
| 105 || July 31 || Cardinals || 5–4 || Ramos (1–0) || Bowman (1–3) || — ||  || 57–48||W2
|-

|-style="background:#fbb;
| 106 || August 1 || @ Cubs || 0–6 || Hendricks (10–7) || Conley (7–6) || — || 40,937 || 57–49 ||L1
|-style="background:#fbb;
| 107 || August 2 || @ Cubs || 2–3 || Hammel (11–5) || Fernández (12–6) || Champan (22) || 40,419 || 57–50 || L2
|-style="background:#fbb;
| 108 || August 3 || @ Cubs || 4–5 || Grimm (1–0) || Ramos (1–1) || — || 47,147 || 57–51||L3
|-style="background:#bfb;
| 109 || August 5 || @ Rockies || 5–3 || Ellington (2–1)   || Estevez (2–6) || Ramos (32) || 27,888  || 58–51||W1
|-style="background:#fbb;
| 110 || August 6 || @ Rockies || 6–12 || Bettis (10–6)  || Cashner (4–8)  || — || 37,699 || 58–52 ||L1
|-style="background:#bfb;
| 111 || August 7 || @ Rockies || 10–7 || Conley (8–6) ||Gray (8–5)  || Rodney (18) || 40,875 || 59–52 ||W1
|-style="background:#fbb;
| 112 || August 8 || Giants || 7–8 (14) || Kontos (3–2) || McGowan (1–3) || — || 22,806 || 59–53 ||L1
|-style="background:#bfb;
| 113 || August 9 || Giants || 2–0 || Koehler (9–8) || Moore (7–8) || Rodney (19) || 19,636 || 60–53 ||W1
|-style="background:#fbb;
| 114 || August 10 || Giants || 0–1 || Samardzija (10–8) || Phelps (5–6)|| Casilla (26) || 21,096 || 60–54 || L1
|-style="background:#fbb;
| 115 || August 12 || White Sox || 2–4 || Rodon (3–8) || Cashner (4–9)|| Robertson (28) || 21,090 || 60–55 || L2
|-style="background:#fbb;
| 116 || August 13 || White Sox || 8–9 || Beck (1–0) || Barraclough (6–3)|| Robertson (29) || 20,006 || 60–56 || L3
|-style="background:#bfb;
| 117 || August 14 || White Sox || 5–4 || Dunn (3–1)  || Sale (14–6) || Rodney (20) || 21,401 || 61–56 || W1
|-style="background:#bfb;
| 118 || August 15 || @ Reds || 6–3 || Phelps (6–6)  || Finnegan (7–9) || Rodney (21) || 16,918 || 62–56 || W2
|-style="background:#fbb;
| 119 || August 16 || @ Reds || 3–6 || DeSclafani (7–1) || Ureña (1–4)|| Cingrani (14) || 14,440 || 62–57 || L1
|-style="background:#fbb;
| 120 || August 17 || @ Reds || 2–3 || Smith (2–1) || Wittgren (3–2)|| Cingrani (15) || 13,973 || 62–58 || L2
|-style="background:#fbb;
| 121 || August 18 || @ Reds || 4–5 || Straily (9–6) || Fernandez (12–7)|| Iglesias (2) || 14,018 || 62–59 || L3
|-style="background:#bfb;
| 122 || August 19 || @ Pirates || 6–5 || Wittgren (3–2)  || Feliz (4–1) || Rodney (22) || 32,957 || 63–59 || W1
|-style="background:#bfb;
| 123 || August 20 || @ Pirates || 3–1 || Phelps (7–6)  || Khul (3–1) || Rodney (23) || 37.828 || 64–59 || W2
|-style="background:#bfb;
| 124 || August 21 || @ Pirates || 3–2 || Ureña (2–4) || Vogelsong (2–3) || Rodney (24) || 28,616 || 65–59 || W3
|-style="background:#fbb;
| 125 || August 23 || Royals || 0–1 || Ventura (9–9) || Cashner (4–10)|| Herrera (8) || 18,518 || 65–60 || L1
|-style="background:#bfb;
| 126 || August 24 || Royals || 3–0 || Fernández (13–7)  ||Gee (5–7)  || Rodney (25) || 17,894 || 66–60 || W1
|-style="background:#fbb;
| 127 || August 25 || Royals || 2–5 || Vólquez (10–10) || Koehler (9–9) || Herrera (9) || 19,045 || 66–61 || L1
|-style="background:#bfb;
| 128 || August 26 || Padres || 7–6 || Rodney (2–3) || Maruer (0–4)  || — || 17,775 || 67–61 || W1
|-style="background:#fbb;
| 129 || August 27 || Padres || 0–1 || Richard (1–3) || Ureña (2–5) || Quackenbush (1) || 20,007 || 67–62 || L1
|-style="background:#fbb;
| 130 || August 28 || Padres || 1–3 || Perdomo (7–7) || Nicolino (2–6) || — || 19,883 || 67–63 ||L2
|-style="background:#fbb;
| 131 || August 29 || @ Mets || 1–2 (10) || Smoker (1–0)|| Wittgren (1–4) || — || 32,188 || 67–64 ||L3
|-style="background:#fbb;
| 132 || August 30 || @ Mets || 4–7 || Lugo (2–2) || Koehler (9–10) || Familia (43) || 32,634 || 67–65|| L4
|-style="background:#fbb;
| 133 || August 31 || @ Mets || 2–5 || Reed (4–2) || Ramos (1–2) || Familia (44) || 33,471 || 67–66|| L5
|-

|-style="background:#bfb;
| 134 || September 1 || @ Mets || 6–4 || Urena (3–5)  || DeGrom (7–8) || — || 29,330 ||  68–66 || W1
|-style="background:#fbb;
| 135 || September 2 || @ Indians || 2–6 || Carrasco (10–7) || Cashner (4–11) || — || 24,415 || 68–67 || L1
|-style="background:#fbb;
| 136 || September 3 || @ Indians || 3–8 || Bauer (10–6)  || Fernández (13–8)  || — || 27,483 || 68–68 || L2
|-style="background:#fbb;
| 137 || September 4 || @ Indians || 5–6 || Allen (3–5)  || Rodney (2–4)  || — || 25,910 || 68–69 || L3
|-style="background:#fbb;
| 138 || September 5 || Phillies || 2–6 || Eickhoff (10–13)  || Esch (0–1)  || — || 20,849 || 68–70 || L4
|-style="background:#fbb;
| 139 || September 6 || Phillies || 3–4 || Morgan (2–9)  || Ureña (3–6)  || Gomez (35) || 16,169 || 68–71 || L5
|-style="background:#bfb;
| 140 || September 7 || Phillies || 6–0 || Cashner (5–11) || Hellickson (10–9) || — || 16,592 || 69–71 || W1
|-style="background:#bfb;
| 141 || September 9 || Dodgers || 4–1 || Fernández (14–8) || Kershaw (11–3) || Ramos (33) || 22,940 || 70–71 || W2
|-style="background:#fbb;
| 142 || September 10 || Dodgers || 0–5 || Hill (12–3) || Koehler (9–11)  || — || 20,933 || 70–72 || L1
|-style="background:#bfb;
| 143 || September 11 || Dodgers || 3–0 || Ureña (4–5)  || Maeda (14–9)  || Ramos (34) || 20,188 || 71–72 || W1
|-style="background:#fbb;
| 144 || September 12 || @ Braves || 7–12 || Roe (2–0) || Ellington (2–2) || — || 18,271 || 71–73 || L1
|-style="background:#bfb;
| 145 || September 13 || @ Braves || 7–5 || Nicolino (3–6) || Wisler (6–12) || Ramos (35) || 20,125 || 72–73 || W1
|-style="background:#bfb;
| 146 || September 14 || @ Braves || 7–5 || Fernández (15–8) || Teherán (5–10) ||Ramos (36) || 21,498 || 73–73 || W2
|-style="background:#fbb;
| 147 || September 16 || @ Phillies || 3–4 (13) || Herrmann (1–2) || Ramos (1–3) || — || 18,171 || 73–74 || L1
|-style="background:#fbb;
| 148 || September 17 || @ Phillies || 0–8 || Hellickson (12–9)  || Ureña (4–7)  || — || 24,597 || 73–75 || L2
|-style="background:#bfb;
| 149 || September 18 || @ Phillies || 5–4 || Dunn (4–1) || Neris (4–4) || Ramos (37) || 20,059 || 74–75 || W1
|-style="background:#bfb;
| 150 || September 19 || Nationals || 4–3 || Ellington (3–2) || Latos (7–3) || Ramos (38) || 17,214 || 75–75 || W2
|-style="background:#bfb;
| 151 || September 20 || Nationals || 1–0 || Fernández (16–8) || Roark (15–9) || Phelps (4) || 17,961 || 76–75 || W3
|-style="background:#fbb;
| 152 || September 21 || Nationals || 3–8 || Scherzer (18–7) || Koehler (9–12) || — || 17,836 || 76–76 || L1
|-style="background:#fbb;
| 153 || September 22 || Braves || 3–6 || Collmenter (3–0) || Ureña (4–8) || Cabrera (5) || 22,086 || 76–77||L2
|-style="background:#fbb;
| 154 || September 23 || Braves || 2–3 || Cunniff (2–0) || Ramos (1–4) || Cabrera (6) || 23,924 || 76–78||L3
|-style="background:#bfb;
| 155 || September 24 || Braves || 6–4 || Ellington (4–2) || Blair (1–7) || Ramos (39) || 26,178 || 77–78 || W1
|-style="background:#bbb;
| – || September 25 || Braves || colspan=7| Game canceled (death of José Fernandez)  
|-style="background:#bfb;
| 156 || September 26 || Mets || 7–3 || Dunn (5–1) || Colón (14–8) || — || 26,933 || 78–78 || W2
|-style="background:#fbb;
| 157 || September 27 || Mets || 1–12 || Syndergaard (14–9) || Koehler (9–13) || — || 21,759 || 78–79 || L1
|-style="background:#fbb;
| 158 || September 28 || Mets || 2–5 || Lugo (5–2)|| Urena (4–9) || Familia (50) || 24,335 || 78-80 || L2
|-style="background:#bfb;
| 159 || September 30 || @ Nationals || 7–4 || Dunn (6–1) || Solis (2–5) || Ramos (40) || 30,857 || 79–80 || W1
|-

|-style="background:#fbb;
| 160 || October 1 || @ Nationals || 1–2 || Roark (16–10) || Chen (5–5) || Melancon (46) || 31,615 || 79–81 || L1
|-style="background:#fbb;
| 161 || October 2 || @ Nationals || 7–10 || Scherzer (20–7) || Brice' (0–1) || Melancon (47) || 28,730 || 79–82 || L1
|-

|- style="text-align:center;"
| Legend:       = Win       = Loss      = PostponementBold = Marlins team memberRoster

Statistics

BattingNote: G = Games played; AB = At bats; R = Runs; H = Hits; 2B = Doubles; 3B = Triples; HR = Home runs; RBI = Runs batted in; Avg. = Batting average; OBP = On-base percentage; SLG = Slugging percentage; SB = Stolen basesPitchingNote: W = Wins; L = Losses; ERA = Earned run average; G = Games pitched; GS = Games started; SV = Saves; IP = Innings pitched; H = Hits allowed; R = Runs allowed; ER = Earned runs allowed; BB = Walks allowed; K = StrikeoutsFarm system

References

External links

2016 Miami Marlins season at Baseball Reference''

Miami Marlins season
Miami Marlins
Miami Marlins seasons